Tzipi Hotovely (born 2 December 1978) is an Israeli diplomat and former politician who serves as the current Ambassador of Israel to the United Kingdom. She served as Deputy Minister of Foreign Affairs, Minister of Diaspora Affairs, Minister of Settlement Affairs, and as a member of the Knesset for the Likud party.

Hotovely is a doctoral student at the Faculty of Law in Tel Aviv University. She practises Orthodox Judaism, and is a self-described "religious right-winger". In 2009, she was the 18th Knesset's youngest member. She chaired the Knesset Committee on the Status of Women in the 18th Knesset, before joining the government at the beginning of the 19th Knesset in 2013.

Biography

Hotovely was born and raised in Rehovot, Israel, to a religious Jewish family. Her parents, Gabriel and Roziko Hotovely, immigrated to Israel from the Georgian SSR prior to her birth. Her political career has been a source of pride in Israel's Georgian-Jewish community. Hotovely graduated from the Religious Zionist Bnei Akiva ulpanit in Tel Aviv. She then served two years of Sherut Leumi, an alternative form of national service to military service available to religious women, where she was placed as a tour guide in Beit HaRav Kook museum in Jerusalem and as a Jewish Agency for Israel representative in Atlanta, US.

She completed her bachelor's and master's degrees in law at Bar-Ilan University, graduating with honors. Upon completion of her academic studies, she interned in the law office of Ram Caspi in Tel Aviv, specializing in corporate law, and became a certified lawyer in 2003. Between 2003 and 2005, she served as the editor of Bar-Ilan's Journal of Law, and later began her studies for a doctorate at Tel Aviv University. During her studies, she was active in the World Union of Jewish Students (WUJS), and represented the organization at a student conference in South Africa. She was also the representative of the World Bnei Akiva movement in Paris. She also studied at the Bruria Seminary in Jerusalem, and the Girl's Seminary at Bar-Ilan University.

Media career

In 2006, Hotovely joined the panel of the political discussion program Moetzet HaHahamim (Council of
the Wise) on Channel 10, hosted by Dan Margalit. Among the panel's members were journalists Amnon Dankner, Tommy Lapid, Ari Shavit, and Gideon Levy. Hotovely represented the right wing on the panel, and was among the critics of the Olmert government following the 2006 Lebanon War. She supported the reserve soldiers' demonstrations, and called on the country's leadership to resign.

Also in 2006, she started writing opinion pieces for Maariv concerning current political issues, and since 2007, she has written a regular column in the Judaism section of nrg concerning links between topics in Judaism and current events. She took part in several television programs on Channel 2: Osim Seder (Making Order) with Ben Caspit, Talking of Current Events with Dalia Neumann, and Medinat Halakha with Uri Orbach and Sarah Blau. She also participated as a guest host in the program HaBayit HaYehudi (The Jewish Home) on Channel 1.

Political career

On 11 November 2008, Hotovely announced that she was joining Likud, and would compete in the party's primaries for the 2009 Knesset elections. She won 18th place on the party's list, and became a member of the Knesset when Likud won 27 seats. While a member of the Knesset's Committee on the State of Women and Gender Equality in 2011, she invited representatives from Lehava (Prevention of Assimilation in the Holy Land), a group whose primary objective is to oppose assimilation of Jews and which objects to any personal or business relationships between Jews and non-Jews, to a discussion of the tactics used by the organization to prevent romantic relationships between Jews and Arabs. Hotovely defended her decision at the time, saying, "it is important to me to check systems to prevent mixed marriages, and Lehava are the most suitable for this."

In March 2011, she wrote that Israeli author Amos Oz was naive, after he sent a Hamas leader a copy of his autobiography, writing that Oz would lack even the instinct to distinguish between Mordechai and Haman.

In July 2011, Hotovely met with Glenn Beck. She told him that "this [Israeli–Palestinian] conflict isn't territorial. ... This is a religious battle led by Islam. We can't ignore this basic truth."

In December 2011, Hotovely gained media attention by sitting at the front of a Mehadrin bus used by some Haredim, where women are asked to sit at the back of the bus.

She was re-elected in the 2013 elections, after winning fifteenth place on the joint Likud-Yisrael Beiteinu list, and was appointed Deputy Minister of Transportation and Road Safety in the new government. She was also appointed Deputy Minister of Minister of Science and Technology in December 2014, after Yaakov Peri quit as the minister. Following the 2015 elections, in which she was re-elected in twentieth place on the Likud list, she was appointed Deputy Minister of Foreign Affairs in the new government.

In July 2017, following the declaration of the Old City of Hebron as a Palestinian World Heritage Site by UNESCO, Hotovely addressed the Arab members of Knesset in a speech, holding up the book of the Tanach (The Old Testament) in one hand and the book A History of the Palestinian People in the other, saying: "I recommend to UNESCO and to the Arab Knesset members to read these two books, the Bible which tells the story of the Jewish people, and Assaf Voll's new best-seller, A History of the Palestinian People: From Ancient Times to the Modern Era. It will captivate you because it is empty. Because the Palestinians don't have kings, and they don't have heritage sites."

In January 2020, Hotovely was nominated for Minister of Diaspora Affairs, but her nomination was put on hold until the Knesset would approve it. She was later sworn in as Minister of Settlement Affairs in the new government in May 2020. In July 2020, she resigned from the Knesset under the Norwegian Law, and was replaced by Ariel Kellner. In August 2020, she resigned as Minister of Settlement Affairs.

On August 2, 2020, she was appointed Israeli Ambassador to the United Kingdom. After the change of government in June 2021 and the Likud's transition to the opposition, newspaper Haaretz reported that Foreign Minister of Israel Yair Lapid wanted to appoint Yael German in her place, but this did not materialize.

On November 9, 2021, Hotovely took part in a debate forum at the London School of Economics (LSE). Protestors on campus accused her for "platforming racism." As a result, she was evacuated under heavy security from the event after pro-Palestinian activists and the LSE Islamic Society organised large protests against her presence. The protests were condemned by British government ministers, including Nadhim Zahawi and James Cleverly, while Home Secretary Priti Patel said she would support a police investigation into the matter. Some publications also pointed out the meeting was held on the eve of the anniversary of Kristalnacht. In response, LSE also released a statement saying that Hotovely was able to finish her talk mostly unhindered on schedule but added "intimidation or threats of violence are completely unacceptable." The Metropolitan Police confirmed officers attended the protest but no arrests were made, and there was "no investigation" launched into the events.

Views and opinions
In 2013, Hotovely rejected Palestinian statehood aspirations, supporting a Greater Israel spanning over the entire land of current Israel, along with the Palestinian territories. She later reiterated her position in a speech to Israeli diplomats on 22 May 2015, rejecting criticism from the international community regarding the West Bank settlement policies and saying that Israel has tried too hard to appease the world, and must stand up for itself. She said: "We need to return to the basic truth of our rights to this country." She added: "This land is ours. All of it is ours. We did not come here to apologise for that." She has also stated that she will make every effort to achieve global recognition for West Bank settlements, as well as asserting that Israel owes no apologies for its policies in the Holy Land towards the Palestinians. She justified her position as she referenced religious texts to back her belief that the Israeli-occupied West Bank belongs to the Jewish people.

In October 2015, in an interview with the Knesset Channel, Hotovely said: "It's my dream to see the Israeli flag flying on the Temple Mount." She added: "I think it's the center of Israeli sovereignty, the capital of Israel, the holiest place for the Jewish people", despite the government's insistence that it has no intention of changing the status quo at the site.

Alongside fellow politician Avraham Michaeli, Tzipi Hotovely is one of the most prominent Georgian-Jewish politicians in Israel, and takes part in events to celebrate the Georgian-Jewish community. In the Knesset, she sponsored a national authority bill to preserve and recognise the heritage of Georgian Jews.

In a 22 November 2017 interview with Israel's i24news, Hotovely said that most American Jews "don't understand the complexities of the region", [the Middle East], because they "never send their children to fight for their country. Most of the Jews don't have children serving as soldiers."

In 2019, Hotovely criticised the Board of Deputies of British Jews. Following the publication of the Board's Jewish Manifesto, which noted support for a two-state solution, she complained that they had not consulted "Israel’s Ministry of Foreign Affairs, our ambassador, any other political authority" before publication; also stating "an organization that supports the establishment of a Palestinian state is working against Israeli interests".

Criticism
Several senior members of the British Jewish community criticized her appointment as Ambassador of Israel to the United Kingdom, mainly because of her "ultra-right-wing" opinions, including Melanie Phillips, Jenni Frazer, Laura Janner-Klausner, and Lord Beecham, who stated: "The appointment of an ultra-right-wing ambassador, while typical of the present government of Israel, will do nothing to win friends in the UK – or indeed any other reasonable country." A petition within the British Jewish community calling for the UK government to reject her nomination as ambassador received hundreds of signatures.

At her first event as ambassador with the Board of Deputies of British Jews, Hotovely described the Nakba as an "Arab lie". She had earlier sponsored in the Knesset groups deemed to be 'racist' who are opposed to mixed marriages; favours a one-state solution that withholds citizenship from  West Bank Palestinians. She was strongly criticised for several of her remarks by Janner-Klausner.

Personal life
On 27 May 2013, Hotovely married Or Alon, a lawyer, in a wedding that had 2,500 guests. She gave birth to her first daughter in 2014, to her second in 2016, and to her third in 2018.

References

External links

 
 Bar Ilan University Faculty of Law Journal publications edited by Tzipi Hotovely Bar-Ilan University Press
 Tzipi Hotovely's column Ma'ariv 

1978 births
Living people
21st-century Israeli civil servants
21st-century Israeli women politicians
Ambassadors of Israel to the United Kingdom
Bar-Ilan University alumni
Deputy ministers of Israel
Government ministers of Israel
Israeli columnists
Israeli newspaper editors
Israeli Orthodox Jews
Israeli people of Georgian-Jewish descent
Israeli women ambassadors
Israeli women journalists
Israeli women lawyers
Jewish Israeli politicians
Likud politicians
Maariv (newspaper) people
Members of the 18th Knesset (2009–2013)
Members of the 19th Knesset (2013–2015)
Members of the 20th Knesset (2015–2019)
Members of the 21st Knesset (2019)
Members of the 22nd Knesset (2019–2020)
Members of the 23rd Knesset (2020–2021)
People from Rehovot
People from Tel Aviv
Tel Aviv University alumni
Israeli women columnists
Women government ministers of Israel
Women members of the Knesset
Women newspaper editors